The women's triple jump event  at the 1992 European Athletics Indoor Championships was held in Palasport di Genova on 29 February.

Results

References

Results

Triple jump at the European Athletics Indoor Championships
Triple
1992 in women's athletics